"Slave to the Music" is a song by the Dutch Eurodance group Twenty 4 Seven. It was released on 13 August 1993, as the third single and first song from their second studio album, Slave To The Music. The song peaked within the Top 10 in at least eight countries. It was a number-one hit in Zimbabwe and peaked at number 2 in Australia.

Chart performance
"Slave to the Music" was a major hit on several continents, remaining one of the group's most successful songs to date. In Europe, it peaked within the Top 10 in Denmark, Finland, Germany, the Netherlands, Norway and Sweden. It didn't chart on the UK Singles Chart in the United Kingdom, but reached number 20 on the Eurochart Hot 100. Additionally, "Slave to the Music" managed to climb into the Top 20 in Switzerland and the Top 30 in Flemish Belgium. Outside Europe, the single peaked at number 2 in Australia and Zimbabwe. In Israel, it reached number 17. It was awarded with a gold record in Germany and Poland, with a sale of 250,000 and 15,000 singles. In Australia, the song earned a platinum record, after a sale of 70,000 units.

Music video
The music video for the song was released in September 1993 by Garcia Media Production, a studio company of Garcia Media based in Amsterdam, the Netherlands. It was directed by Fernando Garcia and Steve Walker. The video features scenes with a jumping toad and a dancing boy called Dion, the scene shows Stay-C & Nance singing. The music video contains different coloured backgrounds. During the making a green screen was used.. "Slave to the Music" was uploaded to YouTube in October 2013. By August 2020, the video had more than 1,1 million views.

Track listing

Vinyl 12", Greece
 "Slave to the Music" (Ultimate Dance Single Mix) – 4:01
 "Slave to the Music" (Ferry & Garnefski Club Mix) – 5:02

Vinyl 12", Netherlands (Indisc)
 "Slave to the Music" (Ultimate Dance Extended Mix) – 6:08
 "Slave to the Music" (Extended Instrumental Mix) – 5:10
 "Slave to the Music" (Ultimate Dance Single Mix) – 4:01
 "Slave to the Music" (Ferry & Garnefski Club Mix) – 5:02
 "Slave to the Music" (Ferry & Garnefski Acid Mix) – 5:09

CD single, Australia & New Zealand (Possum)
 "Slave to the Music" (Ultimate Dance Single Mix) – 4:01
 "Slave to the Music" (Ferry & Garnefski Club Mix) – 5:02
 "Slave to the Music" (Ultimate Dance Extended Mix) – 6:08
 "Slave to the Music" (Ferry & Garnefski Acid Mix) – 5:09

CD single, Europe
 "Slave to the Music" (Ultimate Dance Single Mix) – 4:01
 "Slave to the Music" (Ferry & Garnefski Club Mix) – 5:02

CD single, Scandinavia (CNR Records/Indisc)
 "Slave to the Music" (Ultimate Dance Single Mix) – 4:01
 "Slave to the Music" (Ferry & Garnefski Club Mix) – 5:02
 "Slave to the Music" (Ultimate Dance Extended Mix) – 6:08
 "Slave to the Music" (Ferry & Garnefski Acid Mix) – 5:09

CD maxi, Germany (ZYX Music) (Including New Remix)
 "Slave to the Music" (Ultimate Dance Single Mix) – 4:01
 "Slave to the Music" (Ferry & Garnefski Club Mix) – 5:02
 "Slave to the Music" (Ultimate Dance Extended Mix) – 6:08
 "Slave to the Music" (Ferry & Garnefski Acid Mix) – 5:09
 "Slave to the Music" (Re-Mix) – 5:57

CD maxi, US (ZYX Music) (Including U.S. Remixes)
 "Slave to the Music" (DJ EFX's Funky Tribalist Mix) – 6:20
 "Slave to the Music" (DJ EFX's Bonus A La Pump) – 3:08
 "Slave to the Music" (Tyler's Radio Mix) – 4:03
 "Slave to the Music" (Tyler's Club Mix) – 6:19
 "Slave to the Music" (Ferry & Garnefski Club Mix) – 5:02
 "Slave to the Music" (Razormaid Mix) – 6:04

CD maxi, US (ZYX Music) (Including Mass Attack Radio Edit)
 "Slave to the Music" (Mass Attack Radio Edit) – 4:32
 "Slave to the Music" (Ultimate Dance Single Mix) – 4:01
 "Slave to the Music" (Tyler's Radio Edit) – 4:03
 "Slave to the Music" (Digital Mix) – 6:04

Charts

Weekly charts

Year-end charts

Certifications

References

1993 singles
1993 songs
Twenty 4 Seven songs
ZYX Music singles
Songs written by Ruud van Rijen